San Bartolo is a corregimiento in La Mesa District, Veraguas Province, Panama with a population of 2,440 as of 2010. Its population as of 1990 was 2,411 and as of 2000, it was 2,351.

References

Corregimientos of Veraguas Province